From Beer to Eternity is the thirteenth studio album by American industrial metal band Ministry, released on September 6, 2013 by 13th Planet Records. Although frontman Al Jourgensen had previously stated that this was going to be Ministry's final album (following the death of guitarist Mike Scaccia, who appears posthumously), a follow-up album, AmeriKKKant, was released in 2018. From Beer to Eternity was also the first Ministry album since Houses of the Molé (2004) not to feature Tommy Victor on guitars or bass.

The sole single from the album, "PermaWar", was released by the iTunes Store on August 9, 2013.

Background and recording
In December 2012, Ministry frontman Al Jourgensen, guitarists Mike Scaccia and Sin Quirin, bassist Tony Campos, and drummer Aaron Rossi entered studio sessions and worked on the rough tracks for 18 songs at Jourgensen's 13th Planet Records compound in El Paso, Texas. The sessions turned out to be fruitful, with Jourgensen noting, "We have never, in the history of Ministry, ever had a tracking session like that before. Everything went so smoothly, it was surreal."

Three days after the band had completed the sessions, Scaccia, whom Jourgensen described as the driving force behind the record, died onstage playing with his band Rigor Mortis, due to a sudden heart attack brought on by previously undiagnosed heart disease. Following a funeral in Dallas, Jourgensen and co-producer Sammy D'Ambruoso spent three months in studio to put the final touches on the album.

Artwork
The cover art and accompanying artwork was created by photographer Allan Amato. The artwork features seven female models, who act as sexualized and "monster-ified" personifications of seven deadly sins. On the artwork, Al Jourgensen stated: 

The album artwork and the title were mocked by Josh Modell of the A.V. Club. In response and as a joke, Ministry posted new cover artwork, titled Whole Lotta Glove.

A behind-the-scenes video, depicting the creation of the artwork, was released on June 28, 2013.

Track listing

Samples
 "Thanx but No Thanx" makes use of William S. Burroughs's poem "A Thanksgiving Prayer", as read by Sgt. Major, who also appeared on Ministry's tenth studio album Rio Grande Blood (2006).

Personnel

Ministry
 Al Jourgensen – vocals (1-5, 7-10, 12-14), guitars (1, 3, 8-10, 12, 13), keyboards (1, 3, 10, 12), harmonica (3, 12), programming (6), bass (9, 13), production, mixing
 Mike Scaccia – guitars (3, 7-10, 12), bass (3, 12, 13)
 Sin Quirin – guitars (1-5, 8, 10, 12, 14), keyboards (1, 2, 14), synthesizer programming (2, 10, 14), bass (2, 14), drum programming (10)
 Tony Campos – bass (1, 4, 5, 7, 8, 10)
 Aaron Rossi – drums (2, 8, 14), drum programming (8)

Additional personnel
 Sammy D'Ambruoso – keyboards (1), drum programming (1-5, 7, 8, 10, 12-14), synthesizer programming (2, 3, 12, 14), programming (6), backing vocals (10), noises (11), remix (12-14), engineering, production
 Aaron Havill – theremin (4), synthesizer programming (4, 8, 10), programming (6), sampling, synthesizer, backing vocals, engineering, second engineering
 Patty Fox – backing vocals (8, 10)
 Sgt. Major – spoken word (9, 11, 13)
 Hector Muñoz – backing vocals
 Matt Bridges – backing vocals
 Allan Amato – artwork
 Angelina Jourgensen – executive production
 Dave Donnelly – mastering

Chart positions

References

External links

2013 albums
Ministry (band) albums
Albums produced by Al Jourgensen